Wanq'uri (Aymara wanq'u guinea pig, -ri a suffix, Hispanicized spelling Huancure) is a mountain in the Andes of southern Peru, about  high. It lies in the Puno Region, El Collao Province, Capazo District. Wanq'uri is situated southeast of the mountain Sura Wiqu and northeast of the mountains Tuma Tumani and Ch'ila (Chila).

References

Mountains of Peru
Mountains of Puno Region